Abu'l-Fath Musa succeeded his father al-Fadhl ibn Muhammad to the throne of the Shaddadids in 1031, reigning until his murder by his son and successor Lashkari in 1034.

Sources
 
 

Emirs of Ganja
Shaddadids
11th-century rulers in Asia
1034 deaths
11th-century murdered monarchs
11th-century Kurdish people